Daniel "Danny" Jacobs (born 25 June 1980) is a former Australian rules football player who played with the Essendon Football Club and Hawthorn Football Club in the Australian Football League.

Essendon career
Jacobs played for Essendon from 1999 to 2003, including the 2001 AFL Grand Final loss to Brisbane. After playing 81 games for Essendon, he was traded to Hawthorn at the end of the 2003 season as part of the Veale Deal that resulted in Jade Rawlings being traded to the Western Bulldogs.

Hawthorn career
After missing only two matches in his last three seasons at Essendon, Jacobs' time at Hawthorn was plagued by injuries to his leg, hand, back, jaw and hip. In March 2008, after playing only 45 games over four years, Jacobs announced his retirement from AFL football because of a degenerative hip problem.

In 2010, Jacobs has joined the St Kilda City Football Club (Southern Football League), having crossed over from Port Colts (WRFL).

Statistics

|- style=background:#EAEAEA
| 1999 ||  || 42
| 1 || 0 || 0 || 2 || 0 || 2 || 1 || 1 || 0.0 || 0.0 || 2.0 || 0.0 || 2.0 || 1.0 || 1.0 || 0
|-
| 2000 ||  || 42
| 9 || 3 || 4 || 46 || 37 || 83 || 28 || 17 || 0.3 || 0.4 || 5.1 || 4.1 || 9.2 || 3.1 || 1.9 || 0
|- style=background:#EAEAEA
| 2001 ||  || 42
| 23 || 7 || 7 || 172 || 98 || 270 || 96 || 34 || 0.3 || 0.3 || 7.5 || 4.3 || 11.7 || 4.2 || 1.5 || 0
|-
| 2002 ||  || 21
| 24 || 9 || 9 || 257 || 133 || 390 || 146 || 38 || 0.4 || 0.4 || 10.7 || 5.5 || 16.3 || 6.1 || 1.6 || 1
|- style=background:#EAEAEA
| 2003 ||  || 21
| 24 || 4 || 3 || 185 || 138 || 323 || 119 || 39 || 0.2 || 0.1 || 7.7 || 5.8 || 13.5 || 5.0 || 1.6 || 0
|-
| 2004 ||  || 8
| 12 || 3 || 1 || 70 || 81 || 151 || 65 || 15 || 0.3 || 0.1 || 5.8 || 6.8 || 12.6 || 5.4 || 1.3 || 0
|- style=background:#EAEAEA
| 2005 ||  || 8
| 15 || 2 || 2 || 124 || 119 || 243 || 105 || 18 || 0.1 || 0.1 || 8.3 || 7.9 || 16.2 || 7.0 || 1.2 || 1
|-
| 2006 ||  || 8
| 9 || 0 || 0 || 86 || 69 || 155 || 69 || 12 || 0.0 || 0.0 || 9.6 || 7.7 || 17.2 || 7.7 || 1.3 || 0
|- style=background:#EAEAEA
| 2007 ||  || 8
| 9 || 1 || 0 || 103 || 42 || 145 || 72 || 14 || 0.1 || 0.0 || 11.4 || 4.7 || 16.1 || 8.0 || 1.6 || 0
|- class="sortbottom"
! colspan=3| Career
! 126 !! 29 !! 26 !! 1045 !! 717 !! 1762 !! 701 !! 188 !! 0.2 !! 0.2 !! 8.3 !! 5.7 !! 14.0 !! 5.6 !! 1.5 !! 2
|}

Honours and achievements
Team
 3× Minor premiership: 1999, 2000, 2001

Individual
 AFL Rising Star nominee: 2001

References

External links
 

Hawthorn Football Club players
1980 births
Living people
Essendon Football Club players
Sandringham Dragons players
Australian rules footballers from Victoria (Australia)